Eurytoma amygdali, or the almond seed wasp, is a species of wasp in the family Eurytomidae which is native to  Mediterranean areas, and parts of former Soviet Union.

Diet and Ecology 
E. amygdali is considered a pest in most of its range, especially in northern Greek districts Thessaloniki and Chalkidiki because they insert their ovaries into almond seeds.

Adult 
The adult male has a length of 4-6 mm and the female 6-8 mm. Its body is glossy/shiny black and its legs have a lighter colour.

References

Eurytomidae
Pests (organism)